Ficus ursina is a species of fig tree in the family Moraceae.

It is endemic to Acre state in western Brazil.

References

Sources
 

ursina
Endemic flora of Brazil
Environment of Acre (state)
Trees of Brazil
Endangered flora of South America
Taxonomy articles created by Polbot